John Granger (born 16 July 1899) was a Scottish footballer who played for St Mirren, Dumbarton, Celtic and Forfar Athletic.

References

1899 births
Scottish footballers
Dumbarton F.C. players
Celtic F.C. players
Forfar Athletic F.C. players
Scottish Football League players
Year of death missing
St Mirren F.C. players
Association footballers not categorized by position